An aji, anji, or azu  was a ruler of a petty kingdom in the history of the Ryukyu Islands. The word later became a title and rank of nobility in the Ryukyu Kingdom. It has been theorized to be related to the Japanese aruji ("master"), and the pronunciation varied throughout the islands. It ranked next below a prince among nobility. The sons of princes and the eldest sons of aji became aji. An aji established a noble family equivalent to a shinnōke of Japan.

The aji arose around the twelfth century as local leaders began to build gusuku (Ryukyuan castles). Shō Hashi was an aji who later unified Okinawa Island as king. The title aji variously designated sons of the king and regional leaders. During the Second Shō Dynasty, when the aji settled near Shuri Castle, the word came to denote an aristocrat in the castle town.

A pattern for addressing a male aji began with the place he ruled and ended with the word aji, for example, "Nago Aji". For women, the suffix ganashi or kanashi (加那志) followed: "Nago Aji-ganashi".

List of Aji (1873) 

Oroku Aji (Oroku Udun)
Yuntanza Aji (Yuntanza Udun)
Yoshimura Aji (Yoshimura Udun)
Yonashiro Aji (Yonashiro Udun)
Tomigusuku Aji (Tomigusuku Udun)
Osato Aji (Osato Udun)
Urasoe Aji (Urasoe Udun)
Tamagawa Aji (Tamagawa Udun)
Kunigami Aji (Kunigami Udun)
Omura Aji (Omura Udun)
Motobu Aji (Motobu Udun)
Misato Aji (Misato Udun)
Haneji Aji (Haneji Udun)
Nago Aji (Nago Udun)
Kin Aji (Kin Udun)
Uchima Aji (Uchima Udun)
Mabuni Aji (Mabuni Udun)
Nakazato Aji (Nakazato Udun)
Goeku Aji (Goeku Udun)
Ogimi Aji (Ogimi Udun)
Gushikami Aji (Gushikami Udun)
Mabuni Aji (Mabuni Udun)
Tamashiro Aji (Tamashiro Udun)
Gushikawa Aji (Gushikawa Udun)
Takamine Aji (Takamine Udun)
Kushi Aji (Kushi Udun)
Katsuren Aji (Katsuren Udun)

See also
 Kumemura

References 
Higashionna, Kanjun. (1957). Ryukyu no rekishi, Tokyo: Shibundo.
Higashionna, Kanjun. (1964). Nanto fudoki, Tokyo: Okinawa Bunka Kyokai Okinawa Zaidan.

 
Noble titles
Military engineers